The Villa Bianca (also known as the Grunwell House) is a historic home in Punta Gorda, Florida. It is located at 2330 Shore Drive and was added to the National Register of Historic Places in 1990.

References

External links

 Charlotte County listings at National Register of Historic Places
 Charlotte County listings at Florida's Office of Cultural and Historical Programs

Houses on the National Register of Historic Places in Florida
Punta Gorda, Florida
National Register of Historic Places in Charlotte County, Florida
Houses in Charlotte County, Florida